The skeleton competition at the 2006 Winter Olympic Games was held at Cesana Pariol in Cesana, Italy on February 16 (women's) and February 17 (men's).

Medal summary

Medal table

Events

Participating NOCs
Twenty-one nations competed in the skeleton events at Torino.

References

 
2006 Winter Olympics events
2006
2006 in skeleton